Punjgran Kalan is a town in Gujar Khan Tehsil Punjab, Pakistan. Punjgaran is also chief town of Union Council Punjgaran which is an administrative subdivision of the Tehsil,; and according to the 1998 census of Pakistan, the population of the Union Councils was 13,419.Total Number of Population is more than 1500. The famous people of Punjgran Kalan Raja AAMIR Afsar,Malik Barkat Hussain

References

Populated places in Gujar Khan Tehsil
Union councils of Gujar Khan Tehsil